The Saint-Véran Lake is a fresh body of water in the head area of the Moncouche River (via the Moncouche Lake), in the unorganized territory of Lac-Moncouche, in the Lac-Saint-Jean-Est Regional County Municipality, in the administrative region of Saguenay–Lac-Saint-Jean, in the province of Quebec, in Canada. Lac Saint-Véran is located in the western part of the Laurentides Wildlife Reserve. Its location is almost at the limit of the administrative regions of Saguenay–Lac-Saint-Jean and Capitale-Nationale.

A forest road runs along the southeast shore of Lac Moncouche. A few secondary forest roads serve this area for the needs of forestry and recreational tourism activities.

Forestry is the main economic activity in the sector; recreational tourism, second.

The surface of Lake Saint-Véran is usually frozen from the beginning of December to the end of March, however the safe circulation on the ice is generally made from mid-December to mid-March.

Geography 
The main hydrographic slopes near Lake Saint-Véran are:
 North side: Starr Lake, Huard Lake, Métabetchouane River;
 East side: Étoile lake, Contourné stream;
 South side: Moncouche Lake, Contourné stream, rivière aux Montagnais;
 West side: Métabetchouane River.

The lake Saint-Véran is connected (on southwest side) to Moncouche Lake and is landlocked between the mountains. Its mouth located to the southwest is located at:
  north-east of the confluence of the Moncouche River and the Métabetchouane river;
  north-east of Métabetchouane Lake;
  north-east of the Canadian National railway station Kiskissink;
  to the east of route 155, connecting La Tuque to Chambord;
  south-east of the confluence of the Métabetchouane river and Lac Saint-Jean.

Toponymy 
The toponym "Lac Saint-Véran" was formalized on December 5, 1968, by the Commission de toponymie du Québec.

See also

References 

Lakes of Saguenay–Lac-Saint-Jean
Lac-Saint-Jean-Est Regional County Municipality
Laurentides Wildlife Reserve